Hoelun (also Hoelun Üjin;; Cyrillic: Өэлүн үжин, Өэлүн эх, Mother Hoelun, Öülen/Oulen), 1140–1221 was the mother of Genghis Khan and the wife of his father Yesügei, the chief of the Khamag Mongol confederation. Much of the current knowledge about her life comes from The Secret History of the Mongols. She came from the Olkhunut clan of the Khongirad tribe. She was accorded the posthumous name Empress Xuanyi (宣懿皇后) by Kublai Khan.

Early life
Hoelun was born to the Olkhonud. She was engaged to Chiledu of the Merkit, but was kidnapped by Yesügei on her way back to the Merkit camp after her wedding around 1159. Yesügei abducted Hoelun because of her beauty and physical indications of fertility. He made Hoelun his chief wife. This was an honor, since only the chief wife could give birth to his heirs. She gave birth to five children: four sons, Temüjin (who would be later known as Genghis Khan), Qasar, Hachiun, and Temüge, and a daughter, Temülün. A second wife of Yesugei's, Sochigel, gave birth to two sons, Behter and Belgutei.

Widowhood
After Yesügei's death, Yesügei's Khiyad clan abandoned Hoelun, wife Sochigel, and all of Yesügei's children to follow a rival chieftain. Hoelun immediately took charge of the group and began running up and down the Onon River valley gathering roots, berries, and millet to feed her family. As the boys grew, they learned how to hunt and fish in northern Mongolia's Khentii Mountains, improving the family's situation considerably. Hoelun taught her sons the basics of unity and support for one another, but sibling rivalry between the two eldest sons of the group, Temujin and Behter, eventually led to Temujin murdering Behter, a crime for which Hoelun chastised her son angrily. Despite the killing, Behter's mother Sochigel and surviving brother Belgutai bore no ill will toward Hoelun and her sons and continued living with them.

Life with Temüjin
Temujin was Hoelun's son. Together with his wife Börte, Hoelun was counted as one of the most trusted advisors of Genghis Khan. She also took care of war orphans under the orders of her son, adopting them and bringing them into the family as a part of an inclusionist policy aimed at creating loyalty among conquered tribes. It was at her camp that a Tatar made an attempt to kill her little grandson Tolui, but was stopped by Altani and Hoelun's two guards.

See also
 Bride kidnapping
 History of Mongolia
 Genghis Khan
 Ogedei Khan
 Olympias

References

Genghis Khan
Women of the Mongol Empire
Yuan dynasty posthumous empresses